Mandalapuruder (c. 16th century) was a Jain ascetic and lexicographer.

Literary contributions
The greatest contribution of Mandalapruder or Vira Mandalaver is Sudamani Nigandhu. This work, which he created at the suggestion of his guru Gunapattiren, comprises 989 stanzas arranged in 12 chapters. It treats of the synonyms of the Flindu Deities, and of the objects of the animal, vegetable and mineral kingdoms as well as of the homonymous and generic terms. Mandalapuruder follows the style of Amarakosha in this regard. Mandalapuruder is also the author of a poem in praise of Arha, a divinity worshipped by Jains.

Mandalapuruder is a contemporary of the Vijayanagar Emperor Krishna Deva Raya.

See also

Tamil Jain

References

Tamil poets
Indian male poets
Indian Jain monks
16th-century Indian Jains
16th-century Jain monks
16th-century Indian monks
16th-century Indian poets
People of the Vijayanagara Empire